Echinocereus nivosus is a species of cactus native to Mexico.

Distribution and habitat
The species is known only from two collection sites about 2,000 m above sea level in the Sierra Madre Oriental, in the southeastern part of the state of Coahuila. It inhabits exposed sites of limestone rock.

Conservation
The species is currently classified as Critically Endangered by the IUCN due to its extremely restricted distribution, apparently low total population size, and being sought after by collectors.

References 

Cacti of Mexico
nivosus
Flora of Coahuila